Sheikh Jaffar Khan Mandokhail is a Pakistani politician who was a Member of the Provincial Assembly of Balochistan, from May 2013 to May 2018.

Early life and education
He was born on 26 December 1956 in Zhob District.

He has done graduation.

Political career

He was elected to the Provincial Assembly of Balochistan as a candidate of Pakistan Muslim League (Q) from Constituency PB-19 Zhob in 2013 Pakistani general election.

References

Living people
Balochistan MPAs 2013–2018
1956 births
Pakistan Muslim League (Q) politicians